Twosday is the name given to Tuesday, February 22, 2022, and an unofficial one-time secular observance held on that day, characterized as a fad. The name is a portmanteau of two and tuesday, deriving from the fact that the digits of the date form a numeral palindrome marked by exclusivity or prevalence of the digit 2—when written in different numerical date formats, such as: , 22/2/22 and 2/22/22. It is also an ambigram. According to University of Portland professor Aziz Inan, the palindrome is one of the "ubiquitous palindromes", as it retains its defining characteristics globally, despite the differences in national date formats. In countries that apply the ISO 8601 international standard for the calendar, there is an additional congruence inasmuch as Tuesday is the second day of the week under this scheme.

Anticipation 
The attraction to the date is due to apophenia. Twosday was cited as an example of humans being conditioned under societal institutions to notice only some while ignoring other coincidences that surround them. Attraction to numerology was cited as a reason as well.

In 2016, the website 22-2-22.com was created to count down to the date. Snopes wrote about Twosday in 2018, in one of its articles debunking false rumors about special dates—the claim about Twosday was rated as "True", but the concept was criticized insofar "2/22/2022 certainly features a number of 2s, but isn’t it fudging things to use the 22nd day of a year that includes a number other than two?"

Events 

The interest surrounding the date was noted as a social media phenomenon, with the hashtag #22222 receiving 58 million views on TikTok. Google marked the date with an Easter egg.

Twosday was marked by festivities in several cities:
 In Sacramento, California, 222 couples were married, in a collective wedding at the California State Capitol.
 In Las Vegas, Nevada, weddings were performed at the Harry Reid International Airport. It was suggested that the number of weddings may have broken the record for the most weddings in a single day in Clark County, Nevada.
 In Singapore, 500 couples were scheduled to be wedded, nine times more than the usual.
 An American food holiday "National Margarita Day" coincided with Twosday, and various thematic activities relating to Twosday took place, mostly in the form of sales promotions (such as 22% discounts). Various businesses engaged in other Twosday-specific sales promotions.
 In Prague, a parodical party was organized on the tram line 22 at 22:22 (10:22 pm).

In schools around the United States, children buried time capsules, and did other activities themed on the number two.

2:22 AM/PM births 
Babies being born at 2:22 AM or 2:22 PM on this date created some media interest, with multiple news outlets running stories about such occurences; for example:
 Bodhi James Turner was born in the St John of God Murdoch Hospital in Perth, Australia at 2:22:22 AM.
 Judah Grace was born in room no. 2 of the Alamance Regional Medical Center at Burlington, North Carolina on Twosday, at 2:22 AM. Her mother Aberli had earlier been diagnosed with Hodgkin's lymphoma, and was told by doctors that she could not have children. She named her daughter Judah "because it means praise — just praising God for giving us our heart’s desires".
 Coleson was born in the North Alabama Medical Center in Florence, Alabama at 2:22 AM.
 Landon was born in the Timpanogos Regional Hospital in Orem, Utah, at 2:22 AM. His parents had expected him to be born on 20 February.
 Nevaeh Warren was born in the Mercy Hospital in the New York metropolitan area at 2:22 AM. Her twin sister, Renee Warren, was born at 2:20 AM.
 Logan Jowill Coreas Vasquez was born in the Mercy Hospital in the New York metropolitan area at 2:22 PM. He is the son of Wendy Campos-Vasquez and Mercedes Manual Coreas.
 Simon Thomas was born at the Good Samaritan Hospital in Cincinnati, Ohio at 2:22 PM, in room no. 2.

Other Twosdays 
The subsequent Twosday in the United States date notation (i.e. another 2/22/22 that falls on a Tuesday) is February 22, 2422. In a year that ends with 22 (which could be 2122, 2222, etc.), that is the first subsequent occurrence of February 22 being on a Tuesday, per the 400-year Gregorian calendar cycle.

"Thirdsday" 
In relation to Twosday, Thursday, March 3, 2033 (3/3/33) was named "Thirdsday", a portmanteau of thirds and Thursday. It is not palindromic in the eight-digit format.
Another name used for this date is "Threesday".

In popular culture 
Late-night talk show hosts Stephen Colbert, Jimmy Kimmel, and Jimmy Fallon made references to Twosday in their programmes. Jimmy Kimmel Live! featured a Twosday-themed introductory sing-and-dance segment (calling the show "your second favorite show"), while Colbert conversed with a 2-shaped puppet.

See also 
11/11/11, another common name for the Great Blue Norther of November 11, 1911 (natural disaster)
Doomsday method, and its mnemonic weekday names, which include "Twosday", as an earlier instance of this portmanteau
Framing (social sciences)

Notes

References 

Portmanteaus
Unofficial observances
2020s fads and trends
Palindromes
Numerology
February 2022 events